Cetomacrogol 1000 is the tradename for polyethylene glycol hexadecyl ether, which is nonionic surfactant produced by the ethoxylation of cetyl alcohol to give a material with the general formula HO(C2H4O)nC16H33. Several grades of this material are available depending on the level of ethoxylation performed, with repeat units (n) of polyethylene glycol varying between 2 and 20. Commercially it can be known as Brij 58 (when n=20) or Brij 56 (when n=10). Brij is a trademark of Croda International.

It is used as a solubilizer and emulsifying agent in foods, cosmetics, and pharmaceuticals, often as an ointment base. It is used as an oil in water (O/W) emulsifier for creams/lotions, and a wetting agent.

See also
Isoceteth-20 - a similar material made using iso-cetyl alcohol

References

Non-ionic surfactants